The Witches is a children's opera composed by Marcus Paus to a Norwegian-language libretto by Ole Paus, and based on the 1983 novel of the same name by Roald Dahl. It was written for Gloppen Musikkfest, and was first performed in 2008 with Tora Augestad as the eponymous Grand High Witch. The opera was written especially with Augestad in mind.

References

Compositions by Marcus Paus
2008 operas
Children's operas
Operas set in Norway
Operas set in England
Norwegian-language operas
Operas based on novels
Operas
Musicals based on works by Roald Dahl
Fiction about witchcraft